North Penn - Liberty High School is a diminutive, rural, public high school located at 8675 Route 414, Liberty, Tioga County, Pennsylvania, US. It is one of two high schools operated by Southern Tioga School District. North Penn - Liberty High School serves the southern portion of the district in Tioga County,  as well as two townships in northern Lycoming County: Jackson Township and Cogan House. Formerly called Liberty High School, the building's name was changed when the Southern Tioga School Board closed North Penn High School in 2014, shifting students to this school building.

In 2015, North Penn-Liberty High School enrollment was reported as 299 pupils in 7th through 12th grades. North Penn-Liberty High School employed 22 teachers.

Extracurriculars
Southern Tioga School District offers an extensive program of after school clubs, arts programs and a three times duplicated interscholastic athletics program.

Sports
The district funds:

Boys
Basketball - A
 Soccer - A
Tennis - AA
Wrestling - AA

Girls
Basketball - AA
Softball - A
Tennis - AA
Volleyball - added 2015

Junior high school sports

Boys
Basketball
Soccer
Tennis

Girls
Basketball
Softball 
Tennis

According to PIAA directory July 2015

References

External links
 BLaST Intermediate Unit #17
 Northern Tier Regional Planning Work Force Development
 Pennsylvania College of Technology
 Mansfield University
 Lycoming Career & Technology Center

Public high schools in Pennsylvania
Schools in Tioga County, Pennsylvania
Education in Lycoming County, Pennsylvania